Dublin Food Co-operative Society Limited is a consumer co-operative founded in 1983 and based in Kilmainham, Dublin, with a focus on organic and wholefood products. The Dublin Food Co-op is part of the worldwide co-operative movement.

History

Beginnings 1983-1987

The origins of the Co-op lie with a group of activists brought together by the successful campaign against the construction of a nuclear power plant at Carnsore Point in County Wexford. In 1983, a number of those involved met together to form an organisation through which members could 'shop in an ecologically sound way' and 'promote the rational use of the earth's resources'. Thus, a buying club for the collective purchase of wholefoods was established. For one Saturday each month, the Co-op used a succession of locations in Temple Bar as a focal point to allow members to collect pre-ordered wholefoods and to socialise. In 1986 some members who were also producers began to provide fresh organic produce for sale directly at the Saturday events.

Pearse Street 1987-2007

In 1987, the Co-op arranged to rent the hall at St. Andrew's Resource Centre on Pearse Street, Dublin 2, every second Saturday and switched from monthly to bi-weekly order collections after that. This location became the Co-op's base for the next two decades. When the Co-op settled into the new venue, the process to formally incorporate as a co-operative under the rules of the Industrial and Provident Society Acts 1893-1978 was initiated, and Dublin Food Co-operative Society Limited thus came into being in February 1991. In 1995, the Co-op switched away from the pre-order-only system, began carrying a range of stock for general purchase and moved to weekly trading.

Concerns about the Pearse Street premises limiting the Co-op's scope for development remained a recurring theme over subsequent years.  Other alternatives were explored but it was not until 2007 that relocation occurred, after the Co-op received planning permission and signed a lease on full-time premises at Newmarket, further to the west of the city centre near St. Patrick's Cathedral.  Many members and local shoppers wanted to continue shopping at St. Andrew's and one of them started a Saturday dry goods and producers' market at the venue -  The Super Natural Food Market. This commenced as a weekly event in August 2007, the month after the Co-op departed.

Newmarket 2007-2018

In July 2007, the Co-op switched operations to a large former warehouse at 12 Newmarket, Dublin 8 and added Thursday trading at the new venue from September.  It was formally opened in October 2007 by Minister for the Environment  John Gormley to coincide with Ireland's National Organic Week.

The Co-op also made its hall available for hire and became home to regular events including the monthly Dublin Flea Market, Fusion Market and Newmarket Brocante, plus the annual Independents Day. In April 2013 a new five-year lease for the Newmarket premises was signed.

In the final period at the venue the Co-op moved away from a reliance on market traders for fresh produce and increasingly sourced it directly on behalf of members. Use of the hall was discontinued due to structural issues at a time when the premises were already earmarked for re-development. The 'precarious' situation of the Co-op was resolved with a move to a new location, supported by a crowdfunding campaign.

Kilmainham 2018-
In September 2018, the Dublin Food Co-op announced it had purchased permanent premises in Kilmainham, Dublin 8. Co-op members played a major role in funding the move, raising €60,000 through a 'Help Us Grow' campaign in addition to monies received from Community Finance Ireland. The new store opened on Saturday 10 November 2018. Unlike Newmarket, this location does not incorporate a community space but nearby venues are now used for associated activities.

Activities

The vast majority of food the Co-op sells is organic and particular emphasis is placed on Fair Trade and environmentally-friendly produce. The fit-out of the new shop in Kilmainham has placed an added focus on sustainability and Zero Waste.

Members receive a 5% discount on purchases, which increases to 15% if they also volunteer on a rota system to assist with tasks such as shelf stacking.

The Co-op's membership has seen a significant increase following the move to Kilmainham and numbered 2,870 in April 2019.

Distinctiveness 

A 2009 academic study described Dublin Food Co-op as "distinctive on the Irish scene" because of its organisational structure. At that time, it was one of only two Irish wholefood retailers established as co-operatives and the only one to take the form of a consumers' co-operative (the other, the Quay Co-op in Cork, was organised as a workers' co-operative). The study also argued that the Co-op had "a different pricing structure to conventional businesses, only adding the margin needed to cover its operating expenses".

The Urban Co-op in Limerick was subsequently established as an additional consumer food co-operative in Ireland, after commencing as a buying club in 2013. Within Dublin, a buying club and community-supported agriculture project provide other non-profit food alternatives, but Dublin Food Co-op remains the sole retail food co-operative.

See also
 List of food cooperatives

References

External links 
Dublin Food Co-op website

Organisations based in Dublin (city)
Food cooperatives
Retail companies established in 1991
Cooperatives in Ireland
Cooperatives in the Republic of Ireland
1991 establishments in Ireland